Worcester Warriors Rugby Football Club was a professional rugby union club, based in Worcester, England, that played in Premiership Rugby, the top division of domestic rugby. 

Founded in 1871, in 1975 they moved to their most recent home, Sixways Stadium, located to the north of the city. The team colours were gold and blue. On 9 February 2023 new owners James Sandford and Jim O'Toole announced that the club would not attempt to resume playing games after an earlier administration.

Placed in the eighth tier of English rugby with the advent of the English rugby union league competition, the club were able to build a strong team due to extensive financial support from their backer and chairman Cecil Duckworth,  being promoted repeatedly through the league system. Worcester were first promoted to the highest tier, the Premiership in 2004, and returned there on two occasions following relegation to the RFU Championship. 

Worcester won one major trophy, the 2022 Premiership Cup, and won the second division three times in 2004, 2011 and 2015. They also won four titles in lower divisions while working their way through the English league structure.

In the 2021–22 Premiership Rugby season they finished 11th, entitling them to compete in the 2022–23 Premiership Rugby season, and in the 2022-23 European Rugby Challenge Cup. The most recent director of rugby was Steve Diamond who was appointed in January 2022.

The club entered administration on 26 September 2022 as a result of a tax dispute with the UK Government's tax authority, HM Revenue and Customs. The club was suspended from completing fixtures by the Rugby Football Union. The contracts of all players and coaching staff were terminated on 5 October 2022 following the granting of a winding up petition from HMRC in the High Court. On 9 February 2023 it was announced Worcester was disbanded, with the new owners moving Stourbridge RFC into Sixways Stadium in their place.

History

Foundation
The club was founded in 1871 by the Reverend Francis John Ede, with the first known game played against the Royal Artillery Rugby Club on 8 November 1871. This game was played on Pitchcroft. The club began playing at Bevere in Worcester in 1954 and left Bevere for Sixways in 1975 when the clubhouse was opened. When the league system was formed, the club was placed in North Midlands Division One, a level eight league.

Support
Due to extensive support from their backer Cecil Duckworth, the club were able to build a strong team, with promotion after promotion following. In 2006, extremely ambitious plans were announced for a £23 million development programme, which would see a health club with fitness centre and swimming pool, fully tarmacked park and ride area, and expanded capacity to 11,499.

Promotion to the Premiership

Worcester Warriors were promoted to the (then Zurich) Premiership after winning National Division One in 2003–04 with a perfect record of 26 wins from 26 games, something that had never before been achieved. They were the bookies', and many of the rugby pundits' odds-on-favourites to go straight back down but defied the odds to stay in the Premiership for another season, finishing ninth in the league, after wins against teams including Harlequins, Leeds, a historic victory against Premiership Champions London Wasps and Northampton in a 'winner takes all' end of season finale, which they won 21–19. This match was shown live with more twists and turns off the pitch as well as on it, with then Northampton player, Shane Drahm, who had signed for Worcester eventually starting, and successfully kicking almost everything, after press releases by Northampton stating that he would be a substitute. In the 2004–05 season, despite Premiership survival being their ultimate aim, they reached the final of the defunct European Shield at Oxford's Kassam Stadium, after beating Leeds Tykes in the semi-final. They eventually lost out to the French side Auch. They also managed to achieve a play-off match for the Heineken Cup against Saracens, but their long fight for Premiership survival and an injury-ravaged squad meant that they lost. Their achievements for that season meant that they had achieved much more than they had originally hoped for, as well as earning the respect of the other Premiership sides in the process.

In the 2005–06 season, they reached the quarter–finals of the European Challenge Cup after finishing top of their pool with five wins out of a possible six, above Connacht, Montpellier Hérault and Amatori Catania, and faced an away match against Northampton Saints on April Fool's Day, which they won, in what was described by sports writers as some of the best rugby they have played all season. They reached the semi – finals where they faced Gloucester Rugby in a local derby showdown, it being the third time they had played Gloucester that season, with the European match being played the week after the Premiership match at Kingsholm. Despite playing some thrilling rugby, and looking much more solid as a team than the previous week's Premiership performance, they were knocked out of the competition. The European Challenge Cup was then a much more important competition to Worcester as it offered them a route into the Heineken Cup. In the 2005–06 Guinness Premiership, they avoided relegation and were safe much earlier in the season, which meant that they avoided a repeat of last years relegation battle on the last day of the season. The season culminated in an eighth-place finish in the league on 47 points, one place higher than 2004–05, with the same number of wins (9) but more bonus points and a draw, missing 7th position due to Newcastle Falcons having a better points difference, secured on the last day of the season. This was a huge achievement considering that this is still only their second season in rugby's top flight.

In the 2006–07 season Worcester didn't get off to a very good start and for the majority of the season they were positioned in 12th place, but a good run of form which involved beating some of the top sides in the Premiership, helping them to avoid relegation and send the former Heineken Cup champions Northampton Saints down into National Division One.

Established in the Premiership
For the 2007–08 season Worcester had brought in several big name players, the best known being the All Black Rico Gear. But they again didn't start off very well in the Premiership and did not record their first victory until after Christmas. While they were struggling in the premiership they were enjoying good success in the European Challenge Cup (ECC), progressing through the group stages. After Christmas their premiership form picked up and they beat top teams such as Leicester Tigers and Sale Sharks, which subsequently saw them move out of the relegation zone, Leeds Carnegie replacing them. They progressed even further in the ECC and beat off Montpellier Hérault RC in the quarter-final and saw off Newcastle Falcons in the semi-final which set up a final against Bath. Leeds Carnegie could not survive relegation and were relegated well before the end of the season. The final against Bath resulted in a 24–16 defeat in a one-sided game.

In 2008 Worcester pulled off one of their largest signings ever by signing Australian international Chris Latham from the Queensland Reds, for the 2008–09 season on a three-year deal. The season again didn't go the way it was planned but Worcester still progressed in the ECC and pulled off home and away victories over local rivals Gloucester and London Wasps in the league. However the season ended disappointingly (after Worcester suffered a succession of serious injuries), losing in the semi-final of the European Challenge Cup to Bourgoin.

Relegation from the Premiership
After the disappointment of the 2008–09 Guinness Premiership season, the Warriors made a bright start to the 2009–10 Guinness Premiership season. Either side of a loss to Wasps, they had convincing wins over newly promoted Leeds Carnegie and over Sale Sharks, only their second home win over Sale since they joined the top flight in 2004–05, which was then followed by an unlucky loss at champions Leicester Tigers. A poor spell followed with 10 games without a win. During the winless spell, the club did become the first Premiership team to draw four games in a season and the first team to draw three successive league games. Following this bad spell, the Warriors secured a much needed 13–0 victory over Newcastle at Sixways, before another six consecutive losses. On 25 April, the Warriors were relegated from the Premiership after a 12–10 loss away to Leeds Carnegie, their first relegation in 22 years. They played the 2010–11 season in the Championship with Richard Hill as the new head coach, on a 2-year contract and Chris Pennell as the new captain.

Return to the Premiership
The 2010–11 season saw Worcester win 30 out of 31 games in the Championship, losing the only game to the Cornish Pirates in the main season at Sixways. Worcester were top of the league and top of their stage 2 group. After winning the play-off against Bedford Blues at Sixways and both legs of the play-off final, Worcester secured promotion to the Premiership for the 2011–12 season. Before the season began, there were local news reports that Worcester Warriors
aimed to build a Hilton Hotel on the Sixways site, whilst also building a health and leisure facility and potentially expanding the North Stand.
Hill left the Warriors in April 2013 and was replaced by Dean Ryan.

2013 onwards
Ryan couldn't keep the Warriors in the league in his first season in charge and the club was once again relegated to England's second tier.
However, after releasing a number of older players the club began a rebuilding phase led by Ryan who recruited young talents unable to get game-time at big clubs. Warriors achieved promotion back to the Premiership at their first attempt, beating Bristol in the playoffs thanks to a last minute Chris Pennell try and Ryan Lamb conversion. The club also managed to win the B&I Cup defeating Doncaster 35–5.
Warriors' first season back in the Aviva Premiership during the 2015/16 campaign was a successful one following the redevelopment of the Indoor Training Centre. The club also made a number of high-profile signings in Francois Hougaard, Donncha O'Callaghan and Wynand Olivier and finished the season in tenth position after winning seven games.
In 2016–17 the club finished 11th after a strong finish to the season under new Director of Rugby Gary Gold. Warriors scored a club record of 56 tries in the league. Gold left Worcester in early 2018 and was replaced as director of rugby by Alan Solomons who guided Worcester to another 11th-place finish in 2017–18.

The 2021–22 season saw the club finish 11th in the Premiership and win the Premiership Cup for the first time.

2022 onwards: Financial difficulties, administration and suspension from Premiership
In August 2022 the club was served with a winding-up petition for unpaid tax by HM Revenue and Customs. They played their first game of the season, suffering heavy defeat to London Irish on 10 September 2022.

A statement was released on 13 September confirming that the club were awaiting final contract sign off by a new buyer. Despite the deadline of the following day; the deal was not signed and the RFU issued an ultimatum to the club on 15 September. They had until 12:00 BST on 16 September to confirm compliance for their round two match at Sixways or they would be suspended from the league. Compliance was confirmed by midday and therefore their round 2 match would take place on 18 September 2022. The club received a similar ultimatum for their round 3 match on 24 September. They were able to prove compliance for the match by midday on 22 September and were then asked to prove long term viability by 5pm on 26 September. This deadline was missed and Worcester Warriors along with their women's team were suspended from all competitions. It was later confirmed by the club that they were seeking administration. 

The club were expelled from Premiership Rugby for the season on 6 October and their results were expunged from the table. Subject to finding a buyer they will play in the RFU Championship in 2023–24.

On 16 December 2022, the RFU rejected the club's plans for a return to the Championship in 2023–24 due to the prospective buyers selected by the administrators being unable to fulfill given conditions. Unless an alternative buyer is found the prospective buyers will not be able to operate the club as a professional club.

Rivalries
Worcester have developed two main rivalries in their recent history with Gloucester and Rotherham.

The rivalry with Rotherham stemmed from the clubs meeting each other numerous times in The Championship between 1998 and 2003. Since Worcester gained promotion to The Championship in 1998 the two clubs were constantly at the top end of the table together, battling for the solitary promotion place. In the four seasons they were both in the league, between 1998 and 2003, Rotherham finished 2nd once and 1st three times, whilst Worcester finished 3rd twice and 2nd twice. Due to both teams consistently doing well in the league and tensions between the two clubs high off the pitch, the games often attracted bigger crowds and greater media interest than usual. The importance of the clashes and the rivalry that developed led to the two clubs being dubbed 'The Celtic and Rangers' of their division.

After two close league games in the 2001–02 season, which saw Worcester win the game at Sixways in September by two points thanks to a Tim Walsh drop goal and Rotherham win the game at Clifton Lane in January by 10 points the Rivalry peaked the following season, 2002–03. Rotherham had won the 2001–02 Championship losing just two games with Worcester finishing 2nd having lost three games. However, Rotherham were denied promotion based on the fact that there stadium, Clifton Lane, was not at the required standard. To rectify this and meet premiership stadium criteria, in time for the 2002/03 season Rotherham moved stadiums to Millmoor and shared it with Rotherham United FC.

The first meeting of the 2002–03 campaign between the two teams came at Millmoor on 23 November. Despite being fairly early on in the season, a big five-point win for Rotherham in front of over 4,000 fans, including a sizeable away following from Worcester, was a huge step in Rotherham winning the league and gaining promotion. This encounter was yet again a very heated and physical battle. Worcester were well on top during the first half and went into the interval 13–6 ahead thanks to a Chris Garrard try and some excellent game management from fly half Tim Walsh. However, the second half was a completely different affair and with Worcester's Chris Garrard sent off for a dangerous tackle on Jacob Raulini and Steve Caine sin binned, Rotherham, spurred on by their biggest and most vociferous crowd of the season, scored 32 unanswered points, including four tries to complete a demolition of Worcester.

Despite the big win for Rotherham at Millmoor, Worcester only lost one game until the two teams met again at Sixways in April, winning 12 league games and losing only away to Orrell. This ensured they kept in contact with Rotherham at the top of the table. The game at Sixways was the third last game of the season and, with the sides neck and neck in the league, the winner would almost certainly gain a place in The Premiership. Worcester had gone 20 games and 18 months since their last home loss, which was to Rotherham in September 2001. The game was the first Championship match to be broadcast live on Sky Sports and the game also saw the record attendance for a Championship game, with temporary stands constructed to ensure 5,700 fans could watch. Rotherham brought a 1,000 strong contingent, almost all of whom were sat in the North Stand at Sixways, in what was virtual segregation. The first half of the game was extremely tense, with Rotherham leading 9–3 at half time. However the second half saw Rotherham score two tries in 10 minutes which put the game out of Worcester's reach. Rotherham went on to win the game 21–9, which spark wild celebrations and a pitch invasion from the Rotherham fans.

Rotherham are often considered as Worcester's rivals by those fans who watched Worcester before 2004. However, because Worcester's average attendances have more than doubled since then, a large percentage of the Worcester fan base, many of them newer supporters, see Gloucester as Worcester's main rivals. This is predominantly because of playing them regularly since gaining promotion to the Premiership in 2004, the geographical closeness of the two cities and various media sources citing the game as a derby.

Season summaries

Gold background denotes championsSilver background denotes runners-upPink background denotes relegated

* After dropping into the competition from the Challenge Cup

Club honours

Worcester Warriors
Premiership Rugby Cup
Champions: (1) 2021–22RFU ChampionshipChampions: (3) 2003–04, 2010–11, 2014–15Runners-up: (3) 2000–01, 2001–02, 2002–03National League 1Champions: (1) 1997–98National League 2 NorthChampions: (1) 1996–97Midlands PremierChampions: (1) 1994–95Midlands 2 WestChampions: (1) 1992–93North Midlands 1Champions: (1) 1989–90European Challenge CupRunners-up: (1) 2007–08European ShieldRunners-up: (1) 2004–05British and Irish CupChampions: (1) 2014–15North Midlands CupChampions: (3) 1977–78, 1995–96, 1997–98Runners-up: (3) 1976–77, 1993–94, 1996–97Powerline Floodlit CupChampions: (1) 1997–98Worcester CavaliersPremiership Rugby ShieldRunners-up: (1) 2014–15

Squad

Since 5 October no players are contracted to the team. Until 5 October 2022 Warriors had the following players contracted for the 2022–23 season:

 

Academy squad

The Worcester Warriors academy squad was:

Club staff
Prior to termination of their contracts. The following people were coaches at the Warriors:First Team CoachingDirector of Rugby: Steve Diamond

Forwards coach: Mark Irish
Defence coach: Jonny Bell
Attack coach: Mark JonesAcademy'''
Academy Manager: Mike Hall
Academy Forwards Development Coach: Chris Morgan
Academy Backs Development Coach: Jonny Goodridge

Notable players

Lions Tourists 
The following Worcester Warriors players have been selected for the Lions tours while at the club:

 Ben Te'o (2017)

The following are players who have represented their countries at the World Cup, whilst playing for Worcester:

Sponsors
The club's kit is made by sports manufacturer O'Neills, who they signed with in 2020 to produce home and away strips for Premiership Rugby. Their main shirt sponsor is Adam Hewitt Ltd. In 2019, the club signed a multi-year deal with Aramis Rugby to supply digital scrum machines.

Charitable Causes
Acorns Children's Hospice has been the official charity partner of Warriors since the facility opened in March 2005.
The club have raised in excess of £200,000 to assist the charity since its inception and this season hooker Niall Annett is the charity's Player Ambassador.

Cecil Duckworth is a trustee of the Wooden Spoon, the charity of British rugby, supporting disadvantaged children. In January 2007, Worcester opened a "Playing for Success" centre, supported by Spoon.

Notes

References

External links

 
Premiership Rugby Official Website

 
Premiership Rugby teams
English rugby union teams
Rugby clubs established in 1871
Sport in Worcester, England
Sport in the West Midlands (county)
1871 establishments in England